Egil Hestnes (born 1 June 1943) is a Norwegian politician for the Conservative Party.

He served as a deputy representative in the Norwegian Parliament from Sør-Trøndelag during the terms 1989–1993 and 2001–2005.

On the local level Hestnes was mayor of Hitra municipality from 1987 to 1999 and 2003 to 2007.

References

1943 births
Living people
Conservative Party (Norway) politicians
Deputy members of the Storting
Mayors of places in Sør-Trøndelag
Place of birth missing (living people)
20th-century Norwegian politicians